Neoctenus is a genus of spiders in the family Trechaleidae. It was first described in 1897 by Simon. , it contains 4 South American species.

References

Trechaleidae
Araneomorphae genera
Spiders of South America